Samina Abid is a Pakistani politician and a member of Senate of Pakistan, representing Pakistan Tehreek-e-Insaf.

Political career

She was elected to the Senate of Pakistan as a candidate of Pakistan Tehreek-e-Insaf on reserved seat for women in 2015 Pakistani Senate election.

References

Living people
Pakistani senators (14th Parliament)
Women members of the Senate of Pakistan
Year of birth missing (living people)
21st-century Pakistani women politicians
Pakistan Tehreek-e-Insaf MNAs